Live at Caesars Palace is a live album by the American singer Diana Ross, released in 1974. It was recorded during a 1973 performance at Las Vegas' Caesars Palace. It was the first of two live albums Ross recorded for Motown. It reached No. 64 in the USA (#15 R&B).

Critical reception
AllMusic wrote that "the staged conversations, often awkward monologues, and rough pacing were balanced by some excellent performances, and the album was produced well enough to keep her voice at the core of the sound."

Track listing
Side A:
"Overture" - 0:49
"Don't Rain on My Parade" [from Funny Girl] (Jule Styne, Bob Merrill) - 2:21
"Big Mable Murphy" (Dallas Frazier) - 3:02
"Reach Out and Touch (Somebody's Hand)" (Nickolas Ashford, Valerie Simpson) - 6:57
"The Supremes Medley: Stop! In the Name of Love / My World Is Empty Without You / Baby Love /I Hear a Symphony" (Lamont Dozier, Eddie Holland, Brian Holland) - 5:19
"Ain't No Mountain High Enough" (Nickolas Ashford, Valerie Simpson) - 4:57

Side B:
"Corner of the Sky" [from Pippin] (Stephen Schwartz) - 4:04
"Bein' Green" (Joe Raposo) - 2:49
"I Loves You, Porgy" (George Gershwin, Ira Gershwin, DuBose Heyward) - 1:37
"Lady Sings the Blues Medley: Lady Sings the Blues / God Bless the Child / Good Morning Heartache / 'Tain't Nobody's Biz-ness if I Do"" (Billie Holiday, Ervin Drake, Porter Grainger, Arthur Herzog Jr., Dan Fisher, Irene Higginbotham) - 7:24
"The Lady Is a Tramp" (Richard Rodgers, Lorenz Hart) - 2:29
"My Man" (Channing Pollack) - 4:25

Personnel
Diana Ross - vocals
Gil Askey - arranger, conductor
Marty Harris - piano
Gene Pello - drums
Greg Poree - guitar
Jerry Steinholtz - percussion, conga
Nat Brandwynne and His Orchestra
Devastating Affair - background vocals
Pepito Hernandez - bass
Technical
Armin Steiner - recording engineer
John E. Mills, Ralph Lotten - remix engineers
Bill "The Blade" Lazerus - engineer
David Larkham, Ed Caraeff, Michael Ross - art direction, package concept
Ed Caraeff - photography

Charts

References

1974 live albums
Motown live albums
Diana Ross live albums
Albums recorded at Caesars Palace